Georg Paul Baesecke (13 January 1876 – 1 May 1951) was a German philologist who specialized in Germanic studies, particularly the study of Old High German literature. He was Professor and Chair of German Philology at the University of Halle.

Biography
George Baesecke was born in Braunschweig, Germany on 13 January 1876. After graduating from the Martino-Katharineum gymnasium in Braunschweig, Baesecke studies classical philology, German philology and philosophy at the universities of Göttingen, Berlin and Heidelberg. He received his PhD in Göttingen in 1899 under the supervision of Gustav Roethe. He received his habilitation at Berlin in 1905.

Baesecke was appointed Associate Professor at the University of Berlin in 1911. Baesecke taught at the University of Königsberg since 1913, and was appointed Professor and Chair of German Philology at the University of Halle in 1921. Baesecke specialized in the study of Old High German literature. He became a member of the Göttingen Academy of Sciences and Humanities in 1938, and received the Brothers Grimm Prize of the University of Marburg in 1950.

Selected works
 Die Sprache der opitzischen Gedichtsammlungen von 1624 und 1625, 1899
 Der Münchener Oswald Text und Abhandlung, 1907
 Reinhart Fuchs, 1926
 Der deutsche Abrogans und die Herkunft des deutschen Schrifttums, 1930
 Der Vocabularius Sti.Galli in der angelsächsischen Mission, 1933
 Das Hildebrandlied, 1945
 Vor- und Frühgeschichte des deutschen Schrifttums, 1950-1953
 Kleinere Schriften zur althochdeutschen Sprache und Literatur, 1966

See also
 Otto Höfler

Sources
 Theodor Bögel: Baesecke, Georg. In: Neue Deutsche Biographie (NDB). Volume 1, Duncker & Humblot, Berlin 1953, p. 529
 Wolfgang Milde: Baesecke, Georg. In: Horst-Rüdiger Jarck, Günter Scheel (Hrsg.): Braunschweigisches Biographisches Lexikon – 19. und 20. Jahrhundert. Hahnsche Buchhandlung, Hannover 1996, pp. 35–36.
 

1876 births
1951 deaths
Germanic studies scholars
Germanists
Heidelberg University alumni
Humboldt University of Berlin alumni
Writers from Braunschweig
University of Göttingen alumni
Academic staff of the University of Halle
Academic staff of the University of Königsberg
Members of the Göttingen Academy of Sciences and Humanities